Bedla is a census town in the Bargaon tehsil of Udaipur district, Rajasthan, India. Nearby Bedla, there is Udaipur Tehsil towards South, Gogunda Tehsil towards west, Khamnor Tehsil towards North and Mavli Tehsil towards East.

Demographics
According to Census India 2011 data, Bedla had a population of 5,766 of which 2,991 were males while 2,775 were females. According to same data, female sex ratio was of 928, child sex ratio was around 949 and literacy rate was 88.75%.

References

Cities and towns in Udaipur district